Cyrtosomum is a genus of nematodes belonging to the family Atractidae.

The species of this genus are found in America.

Species:

Cyrtosomum heynemani 
Cyrtosomum kachugae 
Cyrtosomum lissemysi 
Cyrtosomum longicaudatum 
Cyrtosomum penneri 
Cyrtosomum readi 
Cyrtosomum scelopori

References

Nematodes